Ganj Bhawanipur is a town and village development committee in Bara District in the Narayani zone of south-eastern Nepal. At the 2011 Nepal census, it had a population of 6,355 in 910 individual households. There were 3,262 males and 3,093 females at the time of the census.

References

External links
UN map of the municipalities of Bara District

Populated places in Bara District